The 2017 City of Jesolo Trophy was the 10th annual Trofeo di Jesolo gymnastics competition held in Jesolo, Italy. Both senior and junior gymnasts are invited to compete.

Medal table

Medalists

Results

Senior

All-Around

Vault

Uneven Bars

Balance Beam

Floor Exercise

Participants
The following federations sent teams:

References 

2017 in gymnastics
City of Jesolo Trophy
2017 in Italian sport
International gymnastics competitions hosted by Italy